Martin House or Martin Farm or variations may refer to:

England 
Martin House Hospice, a children's hospice in Wetherby, England

United States 
James Martin House (Florence, Alabama), listed on the National Register of Historic Places (NRHP) in Lauderdale County
William H. Martin House, Hot Springs, Arkansas
Owen Martin House, Marcella, Arkansas, listed on the NRHP in Stone County
William P. and Rosa Lee Martin Farm, Marshall, Arkansas, listed on the NRHP in Searcy County
Dr. John Wilson Martin House, Warren, Arkansas
Martin/Ling House, Prescott, Arizona, listed on the NRHP in Prescott, Arizona
Samuel Martin House, Suisun, California, listed on the NRHP in Solano County
Caleb Martin House, Bethlehem, Connecticut, listed on the NRHP in Litchfield County
Gov. John W. Martin House, Tallahassee, Florida
William C. Martin House, Dalton, Georgia, listed on the NRHP in Whitfield County, Georgia
Ritch–Carter–Martin House, Odum, Georgia, NRHP-listed in Wayne County
Martin House (Fulton, Illinois)
Sarah Martin House, Monmouth, Illinois
Pierre Martin House, North Dupo, Illinois
S.F. Martin House, Atlantic, Iowa, listed on the NRHP in Cass County
Dr. G.S. Martin House, Maquoketa, Iowa, listed on the NRHP in Jackson County
Abner Martin House, Mount Zion, Iowa, listed on the NRHP in Van Buren County
Benjamin Martin House, Finney, Kentucky, listed on the NRHP in Barren County
Martin House (Greenville, Kentucky)
Martin House (Hootentown, Kentucky), listed on the NRHP in Clark County
James G. Martin House, Nicholasville, Kentucky, listed on the NRHP in Jessamine County
Lewis Y. Martin House, Nicholasville, Kentucky, listed on the NRHP in Jessamine County 
Maj. John Martin House, Pine Grove, Kentucky, listed on the NRHP in Clark County
Martin House (Shelbyville, Kentucky), listed on the NRHP in Shelby County
Martin House (Columbia, Louisiana), listed on the NRHP in Caldwell Parish
Sidney Martin House, Lafayette, Louisiana, listed on the NRHP in Lafayette Parish
Ed Martin Seafood Company Factory and House, Westwego, Louisiana, listed on the NRHP in Jefferson Parish
James Martin House (Snow Hill, Maryland), listed on the NRHP
Martin House and Farm, North Swansea, Massachusetts
 Martin Farm (Rehoboth, Massachusetts), NRHP-listed
 Martin House and Farm, North Swansea, Massachusetts, NRHP-listed
Martin House (Seekonk, Massachusetts)
Aaron Martin House, Waltham, Massachusetts
Aaron Martin Houses, Waltham, Massachusetts
Wiliam Martin House, Dundas, Minnesota, listed on the NRHP in Rice County, Minnesota
Charles J. Martin House, Minneapolis, Minnesota
 Micajah Martin House, Dublin, New Hampshire, also called Micajah Martin Farm, NRHP-listed
Martin Homestead, North Stratford, New Hampshire
Martin House Complex, Frank Lloyd Wright-designed home in Buffalo, New York, also known as Darwin D. Martin House
 Martin Farm Complex, Lima, New York, NRHP-listed
Hendrick Martin House, Red Hook, New York
Harden Thomas Martin House, Greensboro, North Carolina
Brooke and Anna E. Martin House, Canton, Ohio
Martin House (Cincinnati, Ohio)
 Martin Farmstead, Washington, Pennsylvania, NRHP-listed
Martin House (Wartrace, Tennessee), listed on the NRHP in Bedford County
Henry Martin Farm, Ripley, Ohio, listed on the NRHP in Brown County
George W. and Hannah Martin – John B. and Minnie Hosford House, Portland, Oregon, listed on the NRHP in Northeast Portland
Martin-Little House, Phoenixville, Pennsylvania
William Martin House (Brentwood, Tennessee)
Richard E. Martin House, Forest Hills, Tennessee, listed on the NRHP in Davidson County
Dr. Richard and Mrs. Margaret Martin House, Nashville, Tennessee, listed on the NRHP in Davidson County
Warner Martin House, Rockford, Tennessee, listed on the NRHP in Blount County
Martin-Miller Farm, Rowland Station, Tennessee, listed on the NRHP in Warren County
James Martin House (Walland, Tennessee), listed on the NRHP in Blount County
Martin-Lowe House, Clarendon, Texas, listed on the NRHP in Donley County
Vera Martin-Fiek-Thumford House, Victoria, Texas, listed on the NRHP in Victoria County
Manfred and Ethel Martin House, Vernal, Utah, listed on the NRHP in Uintah County

See also
James Martin House (disambiguation)
William Martin House (disambiguation)
Martin Hall (disambiguation)
Martin Building (disambiguation)
Martin Hotel (disambiguation)

Architectural disambiguation pages